The white-ridged nudibranch, Dermatobranchus sp. 1, as designated by Gosliner, 1987, is a species of nudibranch. It is a marine gastropod mollusc in the family Arminidae. As at November 2009, it remained undescribed by science.

Distribution

This species has to date only been found off South Africa, from the Atlantic coast of the Cape Peninsula to Port Elizabeth, in 10–15 m of water. It appears to be endemic.

Description

The white-ridged nudibranch is a  small nudibranch, reaching 20 mm in total length. It is pale-bodied with opaque white ridges running down the length of the body.  Its rhinophores are set close together on its head and are oval with longitudinal ridges.

Ecology
The white-ridged nudibranch feeds on soft corals.

References

Arminidae
Undescribed gastropod species